The 1998 Buffalo Bulls football team represented the University at Buffalo in the 1998 NCAA Division I-AA football season. The Bulls offense scored 315 points while the defense allowed 340 points.

Schedule

References

Buffalo
Buffalo Bulls football seasons
Buffalo Bulls football